Asia-Oceania Korfball Championship is the korfball competition played by the Asian and Oceanian national teams, organized by the Asia-Oceania Korfball Federation and the International Korfball Federation.

Results

Most successful national teams

External links
Asia-Oceania Korfball Federation 
History IKF Asia Oceania Korfball Championship

Asia-Oceania Korfball Championship
Korfball_Championship
Recurring sporting events established in 1990